Gilead is a novel written by Marilynne Robinson published in 2004. It won the 2005 Pulitzer Prize for Fiction and the National Book Critics Circle Award. It is Robinson's second novel, following Housekeeping (1980). Gilead is an epistolary novel, as the entire narrative is a single, continuing, albeit episodic, document, written on several occasions in a form combining a journal and a memoir. It comprises the fictional autobiography of the Reverend John Ames, an elderly, white Congregationalist pastor in the small, secluded town of Gilead, Iowa (also fictional), who knows that he is dying of a heart condition. At the beginning of the book, the date is established as 1956, and Ames explains that he is writing an account of his life for his seven-year-old son, who will have few memories of him. Ames indicates he was born in 1880 and that, at the time of writing, he is seventy-six years old.

Plot
The book is an account of the memories and legacy of John Ames as he remembers his experiences of his father and grandfather to share with his son. All three men share a vocational lifestyle and profession as Congregationalist ministers in Gilead, Iowa. John Ames describes his vocation as "giving you a good basic sense of what is being asked of you and also what you might as well ignore", explaining that your vocation is something both hard to fulfill and hard to obtain. He writes that this is one of the most important pieces of wisdom he can bestow upon his son. Ames's father was a Christian pacifist, but his grandfather was a radical abolitionist who carried out guerrilla actions with John Brown before the American Civil War, served as a chaplain with the Union forces in that war, and incited his congregation to join up and serve in it; as Ames remarks, his grandfather "preached his people into the war." The grandfather returned from the war maimed with the loss of his right eye. Thereafter he was given the distinction that his right side was holy or sacred in some way, that it was his link to commune with God, and he was notorious for a piercing stare with the one eye he had left.

The grandfather's other eccentricities are recalled in his youth: the practice of giving all and any of the family's possessions to others and preaching with a gun in a bloodied shirt. The true character and intimate details of the father are revealed in context with anecdotes regarding the grandfather, and mainly in the search for the grave of the grandfather. One event that is prevalent in the narrator's orations is the memory of receiving 'communion' from his father at the remains of a Baptist church, burned by lightning (Ames recalls this as an invented memory adapted from his father breaking and sharing an ashy biscuit for lunch). In the course of the novel, it quickly emerges that Ames's first wife, Louisa, died while giving birth to their daughter, Rebecca (a.k.a. Angeline) who also died soon after. Ames reflects on the death of his family as the source of great sorrow for many years, in contrast and with special reference to the growing family of the Rev. Boughton, local Presbyterian minister and Ames's dear and lifelong friend.

Many years later Ames meets his second wife, Lila, a less-educated woman who appears in church one Pentecost Sunday. Eventually Ames baptizes Lila and their relationship develops, culminating in her proposal to him. As Ames writes his memoirs, Boughton's son, John Ames Boughton (Jack), reappears in the town after leaving it in disgrace twenty years earlier, following his seduction and abandonment of a girl from a poverty-stricken family near his university. The daughter of this relationship died poor and uncared-for at the age of three, despite the Boughton family's well-intended but unwelcome efforts to look after the child. Young Boughton, the apple of his parents' eye but deeply disliked by Ames, seeks Ames out; much of the tension in the novel results from Ames's mistrust of Jack Boughton and particularly of his relationship with Lila and their son. In the dénouement, however, it turns out that Jack Boughton is himself suffering from his forced separation from his own common-law wife, an African American from Tennessee, and their son; the family are not allowed to live together because of segregationist laws, and her family utterly rejects Jack Boughton. It is implied that Jack's understanding with Lila lies in their common sense of tragedy as she prepares for the death of Ames, who has given her a security and stability she has never known before.

Although there is action in the story, its mainspring lies in Ames's theological struggles on a whole series of fronts: with his grandfather's engagement in the Civil War, with his own loneliness through much of his life, with his brother's clear and his father's apparent loss of belief, with his father's desertion of the town, with the hardships of people's lives, and above all with his feelings of hostility and jealousy towards young Boughton, whom he knows at some level he has to forgive. Ames's struggles are illustrated by numerous quotations from the Bible, from theologians (especially Calvin's Institutes of the Christian Religion), and from philosophers, especially the atheist Feuerbach, whom Ames greatly respects.

The abstract and theological content of the book is seen through the eyes of Ames, who is presented in a deeply sympathetic manner and who writes his memoir from a position of serenity, despite his suffering and a knowledge of his own limitations and failings. Throughout the novel, Ames details a reverential awe for the transcendental pathos in the small personal moments of happiness and peace with his wife and son and the town of Gilead, despite the loneliness and sorrow he feels for leaving the world with things undone and unsolved. He is able to revel in the beauty of the world around him and takes the time to appreciate and engage with these small wonders at the end of his life. In this way the novel teaches the importance of stepping back and enjoying present realities. Ames marvels in the everyday and commonplace and wishes this attitude for his son, also. He proclaims his desire for his son "to live long and… love this poor perishable world". Ames takes the time to be fully present and intentional in everything that he does, no matter how small or insignificant it may seem. An example of this from the novel is towards the beginning on page 5 when he passes two young men joking around and laughing with one another on the street and Ames is filled with a sense of awe at the beauty of such a simple expression of friendship and joy. In this way Ames sees the allure in both the ordinary and mundane as well as the tragic. He begins to express a viewpoint that the purpose of life is to look for things to appreciate and be thankful for. In the closing pages of the book, Ames learns of Jack Boughton's true situation and is able to offer him the genuine affection and forgiveness he has never before been able to feel for him.

Influences
According to Robinson, the fictional town of Gilead ("Gilead" means 'hill of testimony' in the Bible – Genesis 31:21) is based on the real town of Tabor, Iowa, located in the southwest corner of the state and well known for its importance in the abolition movement. Likewise, the character of the narrator's grandfather is loosely based on the real-life story of John Todd, a congregationalist minister from Tabor who was a conductor on the Underground Railroad, and who stored weapons, supplies and ammunition used by abolitionist John Brown in his "invasion" of Missouri in 1857 to free a group of slaves, and later—without Todd's knowledge or involvement—in his 1859 raid on the U.S. military arsenal at Harpers Ferry, West Virginia. Robinson talks about Ames's grandfather's involvement in the civil war. She mentions an illness known as 'camp fever'. The term was generally used to describe Typho-malarial fever. Symptoms included: pronounced chills followed by fever, abdominal tenderness, nausea, general debility, diarrhea, retention of urine, and furring of the tongue. Also, as John Ames was describing his sermons in his letter, he tells his son that there was one he had burned before he was supposed to preach it. This sermon was written around the time of the Spanish Influenza.

Regarding Robinson's theological influences in Gilead, she herself has explained the importance of primary Calvinist texts, particularly Calvin's Institutes of the Christian Religion. In regard to Calvin's Institutes, Robinson states in her Yves Simone lecture entitled "The Freedom of a Christian," that "one of the reasons these texts are important to me is because they have everything to do with my own theology certainly, with my aesthetic perhaps, and in so far as I can say I have an intention in writing, they have everything to do with my intention".

Societal impact
Gilead has been recognized as a text that works to correct modern misconceptions regarding John Calvin, Calvinism, and the Puritans. Robinson said in a lecture entitled "The Freedom of a Christian," that she thinks "that one of the things that has happened in American Cultural History is that John Calvin has been very much misrepresented. As a consequence of that, the parts of American Culture that he influenced are very much misrepresented". She expounds upon this idea in her book of essays, The Death of Adam. She writes that the Puritans should "by no means be characterized by fear or hatred of the body, anxiety about sex or denigration of women, yet for some reason, Puritanism is uniquely regarded as synonymous with the preoccupations." Roger Kimball, in his review of The Death of Adam in The New York Times wrote, "We all know that the Puritans were dour, sex-hating, joy-abominating folk – except that, as Robinson shows, this widely embraced caricature is a calumny". The common modern characterization of the Calvinists as haters of the physical world and joyless exclusivists is the stereotype that Robinson works to deconstruct in Gilead through a representation of what she considers to be a more accurate understanding of Calvinist doctrine that she derives mainly from the original texts, specifically Calvin's Institutes of the Christian Religion.

The novel has also been the focus of debates on Christian multiculturalism in literature. University of Victoria professor of American Literature Christopher Douglas claims that Gilead builds a "contemporary Christian multicultural identity suitably cleansed of the complexity of [...] 'Christian slavery'." He contextualizes the work within the political resurgence of fundamentalist and evangelical Christianity in the last four decades.

In a poll of US literary critics that was conducted by BBC Culture and had its results shared in January 2015, Gilead was voted the fourth greatest novel written since 2000. In 2019, the novel was ranked 2nd on The Guardian list of the 100 best books of the 21st century. On November 5, 2019, the BBC News listed Gilead on its list of the 100 most influential novels.

Former President of the United States Barack Obama lists the novel as one of his favorites. On September 14, 2015, in Des Moines, Iowa, in a reversal of the usual journalistic convention, President Obama interviewed Marilynne Robinson for The New York Review of Books, and told her,

Companion novels 
Robinson has used characters and events from Gilead in three subsequent novels to date. Home (2008) retells events of the story from the perspective of their friends and neighbors the Boughtons. Lila (2014) retells the Ames's courtship and marriage from her perspective. Jack (2020) tells the story of the Boughtons' black sheep, further detailing his relationship with a woman of color, a union unknown to his family.

References

External links
 Novel description at publisher's site
 .
 Short essay analyzing the novel's style of narration and its implications
 .
 .
 Photos of the first edition of Gilead
 .

2004 American novels
Pulitzer Prize for Fiction-winning works
Ambassador Book Award-winning works
Novels set in Iowa
Farrar, Straus and Giroux books
Epistolary novels
PEN/Faulkner Award for Fiction-winning works
Novels by Marilynne Robinson
First-person narrative novels
Novels set in the 1950s
National Book Critics Circle Award-winning works